Mir Jalaleddin Kazzazi (born 19 January 1949) is a professor of Persian literature and an Iranist.

Kazzazi is a professor of literature at Allameh Tabatabaii University in Tehran.

Kazzazi was selected as one of the Iran's memorable figures, for his contribution to Persian culture and literature.

See also 

Iranology
Kermanshahis
Shahnameh

External links

  
 @drKazzazi Instagram Page
 71st anniversary of the Academy of Persian Language and Literature, BBC 

Iranian Iranologists
Academic staff of the Islamic Azad University
Living people
1949 births
People related to Persian literature
Linguistic purism in Persian
Shahnameh Researchers
Iranian Science and Culture Hall of Fame recipients in Literature and Culture